The Review of English Studies is an academic journal published by Oxford University Press covering English literature and the English language from the earliest period to the present. RES is a "leading scholarly journal of English literature and the English language" whose critical "[e]mphasis is on historical scholarship rather than interpretative criticism, though fresh readings of authors and texts are also offered in light of newly discovered sources or new interpretation of known material."

References 

Literary magazines published in the United Kingdom
English-language journals
Publications established in 1925
Oxford University Press academic journals
5 times per year journals